Dythemis is a Neotropical genus of dragonflies in the Libellulidae family, commonly known as Setwings.

There are seven species. In 2011, it was proposed that D. multipunctata be made a subspecies of D. sterilis, and individuals of the species in the Lesser Antilles be called D. nigra.

Species
The genus includes the following species:

References

Libellulidae
Anisoptera genera
Taxa named by Hermann August Hagen